Kamenný Přívoz is a municipality and village in Prague-West District in the Central Bohemian Region of the Czech Republic. It has about 1,500 inhabitants. It lies on the Sázava River.

Administrative parts
Villages of Hostěradice, Kamenný Újezdec and Žampach are administrative parts of Kamenný Přívoz.

References

Villages in Prague-West District